Lepidochrysops ignota, the Zulu blue, is a butterfly of the family Lycaenidae. It is found in South Africa, from the KwaZulu-Natal midlands to Eswatini, Mpumalanga, Limpopo and Gauteng.

The wingspan is 27–29 mm for males and 27–30 mm for females. Adults are on wing from October to November. There is one generation per year.

The larvae feed on Ocimum species. Third and later instar larvae feed on the brood of Camponotus niveosetus ants.

References

Butterflies described in 1887
Lepidochrysops
Endemic butterflies of South Africa
Taxa named by Roland Trimen